Balakhninsky (masculine), Balakhninskaya (feminine), or Balakhninskoye (neuter) may refer to:

Balakhninsky District of Nizhny Novgorod Oblast, Russia
Balakhninsky (urban-type settlement), an urban-type settlement in Irkutsk Oblast, Russia